National Alliance of People's Movements is an alliance of alter-globalisation activist groups in India. It is an umbrella organisation for various civil society organisations and individuals working towards similar goals.

It has led protests on various issues opposing globalization, nuclear energy, and protests supporting electoral reforms.

History 
In the 1990s, with economic liberalisation in India and communal violence like the Babri Masjid demolition, groups opposed to globalization, communalism, and discrimination united to form the National Alliance of People's Movements in 1992. One of the founding members was Medha Patkar, of Narmada Bachao Andolan, who later also founded Ghar Bachao Ghar Banao Aandolan in 2004–5.

Ideology 
NAPM provides a forum for the coming together of a number of ideologies. In its own programmes, actions and conceptualisation of development perspectives on an emerging paradigm of sustainable development, equity, freedom, justice, and peace NAPM draws from the ideas of Mahatma Gandhi, B. R. Ambedkar, Karl Marx, Ram Manohar Lohia, Jyotirao Phule, Periyar Ramasami and others.

People Involved in the Movement 
Leaders involved with the movement include:
 Medha Patkar
Aruna Roy
Sandeep pandey
Prafulla Samantra
Sunilam
Arundhati Dhuru
Sunit S.R
Kamayani Swami
Vimal Bhai
Gabriele Dietrich
Madhuresh Kumar
 Lingaraj Azad
 Baba Amte
Ashish Ranjan
Meera Sanghmitra
Anand Mazgaongkar
Mahendra Yadav
Basant Hetamsariya
Faisal Khan
Kailash Meena
Rajkumar Sinha
Kusumam Joseph
Sister Celia
Krishna Kant
Sanjay M.G.
Rajendra Ravi

Member Organisations

Andhra Pradesh 
 Andhra Pradesh Vyavasaya Vruthidarula Union (APVVU)
 Anu Vidyat Kendram Vyatireka Porata Udyamam Pradesh
 Chattri
 Human Rights Forum (http://humanrightsforum.org/)
 Jana Vigyan Vedika (http://jvv-ap.blogspot.in/)
 Kakrapalli Thermal Vyatireka Porata Committee
 Paryavarana Parirakshana Vedika
 Polavaram Project Vyathireka Dalita Bahujana porata Committee
 Sanjeevani Paryavarana Parirakshana Seva Sangham, Srikakulam
 Sompeta Paryavarana Parirakshana Samiti

Arunachal Pradesh 
 Forum for Siang Development

Assam 
 Krishak Mukti Sangram Samiti

Bihar 
 Asangathit Kshetra Kaamgar Sangathan
 Asha Parivar
 Ashray Abhiyan
 Ati Pichda Warg Samanvay Samiti
 Badh Mukhti Abhiyan
 Badh Per Nagrik Pahar
 Bandi Adhikar Aandolan
 Bhagat Singh Kranti Vichar Manch, Patna
 Bihar Jan Sakti Manch
 Brajkishore Navnirman Sanstha
 Building Mazdoor Union
 Bunkar Sangh
 Chapra Mahila Baal Sudhaar Samiti
 Ganga Diara Mukti Andolan
  Jan Jagran Shakti Sangathan (JJSS) 
 Jhuggi Jhopari Shahari Gareeb Sangharsh Samiti
 Jhugi Jhopari Sanyukt Sangharash Morcha
 Khet Bachao Jeevan Bachao Jan Sangarsh Samitee
 Kisan Sangharsh Morcha
 Kosi Nav Nirmaan Manch
 Kosi Vikas Sangharsh Samiti
 Lok Parishad
 Loktantra Senani Parishad, Siwan
 Mahila Adhikar Morcha
 Manas Kunj Foundation
 Manav Sanrakshan Samiti, Siwan
 Manav Joro Manch
 Mushar Vikas Manch
 Navjivan Samajik Kendra
 Nidan, Bihar
 Pasmanda Muslim Samaj manch
 Patna Jila Jhuggi Jhopdi Nivasi sangh
 Prayas Gramin Vikas Samiti (PGVS)
 Sahaj, Buxar
 Samajwadi Jan Parishad
 Sampoorna Kranti Sahayogi Manch
 Slum Vikas Samiti
 Soochna Adhikar Abhiyan
 Times of India, Workers Union
 Upjao Bhumi Sangharsh Samiti
 Vanchit Janmorcha
 Vrihad Sahjan Sewa Samiti

Chhattisgarh 
 Ardhik Nyay Manch
 Nadi Ghati Morcha
 Chhattisgarh Mukti Morcha
 Chhattisgarh Mahila Manch
 Chhattisgarh Jan Chetna, Raigarh
 Raigarh Sangharsh Morcha
 Nayi Rajdhani Prabhavit Kisan Sangharsh Samiti
 Rashtriya Rajmarg Prabhavit Kisan – Nagrik Sangharsh Samiti

Delhi 
 All India Kachhra Shramik Maha Sangh
 Bhumi Bachao Aandolan, Kanjhawala
 Delhi Forum
 Jan Sangharsh Vahini
 Maharishi Valmiki Atma Jagran Samiti
 National Cyclist Union
 National Domestic Workers Union
 People's Lawyer's Forum
 Shahri Mahila Kamgar Union

Gujarat 
 Bhavnagar Jilah Gram Bachao Samiti
 Gujarat Sarvoday Mandal, Ahmedabad
 Jyoti Karmachari Mandal, Vadodara
 Kinara bachao Sangharsh Samiti, Umargaon
 Manviya Technology Forum, Ahmedabad
 Narmada Bachao Andolan
 Paar Poorna Aadivasi Sangathan, Dharampur
 Paryavaran Suraksha Samiti
 Rajpipila Social Service Society, Gujarat

Haryana 
 Beti Bachao Andolan
 Parmanu Virodhi Morcha
 Berpjgar Yuva Sangathan
 Dastak
 Shaheed Bhagat Singh Disha Manch
 Haryana Kisan Manch

Jharkhand 
 Aadivasi Moolwaasi Astitava Raksha Munch
 Ghatwar Adivasi Mahasabha Jharkhand
 Jharkhand Alternative Forum
 Ulgulan Manch, Jharkhand

Karnataka 
 Chiguru
 Domestic Workers Union
 Garment Mahila Karmikara Munnade
 Garments & Textile Workers Union
 Indian Social Institute – Bangalore
 Karnataka Domestic Workers Union
 Kranti Kattada Karmikara Sangha
 Navachetana
 Nisarga
 Praja Rajakiya Vedike
 Preethi Mahilodaya
 Sama Samaja Vedike
 Sanchaya Neelya
 SIGNA
 Slum Abhivorddi Samiti
 Slum Jana Andolana
 Thamate

Kerala 
 Adivasi Sangarsh Sangham, Palakkad
 Chalakudy River Protection Forum
 Coca-Cola Virudha Samara Samiti, Plachimada
 Endosulfan Virudh Samara Samiti
 Kerala Swantra Malsya Thozhilaley Federation (KSMTF)
 Laloor Malinya Virudh Samiti
 Madya Shala Karma Virudha Samiti, Shathipuram
 National Highway Protection Forum, Kerala
 NGIL Virudh Samara Samiti, Kathikulam
 Salsbeel Green School, Thrissur
 State H.R. Protection Centre
Radical Students Forum (RSF)

Madhya Pradesh 
 Bargi Bandh Visthapit Sangh
 Jhuggi Basti Sangharsh Morcha
 Kisan Sangharsh Samiti, Madhya Pradesh
 Narmada Bachao Andolan
 Swasthya Adhikar Manch
 Yuva Kranti Dal, Sivani

Maharashtra 
 Apanalaya
 Bhartiya Swatantra Shetmazdoor Sanghathan
 Central and Western Catering Association
 Central Railway Caterer's Association
 Ekvira jamin Bachao Andolan
 Ghar Bachao Ghar Banao Andolan
 Goshikhurd Prakalpgrasth Sangharsh Samiti
 Loha Prakalp Virodhi Sangharsh Samiti, Korchi, Gadchiroli
 Nimna Painganga Dharan Virodhi Sangharsha Samiti, Yeotmal
 Maharashtra Railway Boot Polish Kaamgaar Mahasangh
 Maharashtra Sarvodya Mandal
 Man Gaon Bachao Andolan
 Mose Khore Bachao Andolan, Pune
 Nagari Hakka Suraksha Samiti, Pimpri – Chinchwad
 Narmada Bachao Andolan
 Narmada Navnirman Abhiyan
 Sahkar Bachav Samiti
 Sapli Sangharsh Samiti
 Sarvahara Jan Andolan, Raigarh
 Shahr Vikas Manch, Mumbai
 Shahri Mahila Kamgar Sangathan Delhi
 Shoshit Jan Andolan
 Shramik Mukti Sangathana
 South Central Caterer's Association
 Tata Dharangrast Sangharsh Samiti
 Wang Marathwadi Dharangrasth Sangharsh Samiti, Satara
 Yusuf Mehrally Centre
 United India Consumer's Association, Mira-Bhayander

Orissa 
 Darlipali Anchalika Jibika Sangram Samiti
 Deomali Surakshya Sangram Samiti, Koraput
 Gandha Mardhan Surakhya Parishad
 Jala Surakshya Janamancha, Cuttack
 Kalahandi Mahila Mahasangh
 Kalahandi Sachetan Nagarik Mancha
 Khandadhar Banchao Andolan
 Lokshakti Abhiyan
 Lower Suktel Budianchal Sangram Parisad
 Mahaguja Koila Khani Bisthapan Birodhi Manch
 NarajTata Thermal Power Plant Pratirodh Andolan
 Niyamgiri Surakhya Samiti
 Pira Jaharion Bhitamati Surakhya Manch
 Rairakhol Bhimabhoi Krushak Sangharsa Samiti
 Rajya Krushak Sangathan
 Sahara Power Plant Birodhi Manch
 Sasubohu Mali Surakhya Samiti
 Sterlite Bisthapan Birodhi Manch
 Subarnarekha Bisthapita Mukti Bahini
 Upakula Bhitamati Surakhya Committee
 Vedanta Viswa Vidyalaya Birodhi Sangharsa Samiti
 Yusuf Meherally Yuva Biradari

Punjab 
 Bharat Vikas Parishad, Ludhiana
 Bhartiya Jan Vigyan Jatha
 Senior Citizens Pensioners Association, Ludhiana
 Shaheed Bhagat Singh Youth Federation, Ropar
 Small Scale Industrialists and Traders Association

Rajasthan 
 Bhumi Adhigrahan Virdohi Sangarsh Samiti, Jhunjhunu
 Mazdoor Kisan Shakti Sangathan
 Navalgarh Kisan Sangarsh Samiti
 PUCL, Rajasthan
 Rajasthan Jan Adhikar Manch, Jaipur
 Rajasthan Samagr Seva Sangh
 Dalit Adhikar Kendra, Jaipur
 Jal Jangal Jameen Andolan, Dakhin Rajasthan

Tamil Nadu 
 Nirman Mazdoor Panchayat Samagam
 Pennurium Iyakkum
 TGMMNS, THERVOY
 Unorganized Sector workers Federation
 Tamil Nadu Organic Agriculture Movement, Madurai

Uttarakhand 
 Matu Jan Sangathan

Uttar Pradesh 
 Acharya Mahabeer Prasad Dewedi Rashtriya Smarak Samiti
 Asha Parivar
 Ayodhya Ki Awaz
 Bhartiya Kisan Majdur Sanyukat Morcha
 Kaimur Kshetra Mahila Mazdoor Sangharsh Samiti
 Kisan Manch
 Kisan Sangharsh Samiti
 Loksamiti, Varanasi
 Rajkeeya Ashram Padhyati Samvida Sikshak Sangh U.P.
 Rashtriya Smarak Samiti, Bareli
 Sangatin Kisan Mazdoor Sangathan, Sitapur

West Bengal 
 Aadivasi Jami Raksha Committee, North Bengal
 Hawkers Sangram Samiti
 Hindi Urdu Mahila Samity
 Jan Sanskruti Centre – Theatre of the oppressed
 Nandigram Struggle Committee
 Pannu Paribahan Sangram Committee
 Paschim Bengal Khet Mazdoor Samiti
 Sara Bangla Truck Parichalak Sangathan Samanvay Samiti
 Transferred Area Surjapur Organisation – North Bengal

Pan India Organisations 
 Akhil Bhartiya Khan Pan Licensee Association
 All India Bank Deposit Collector Federation (UCO Bank Coordination Committee)
 Indian Railways Caterer Association
 Khudai Khidmatgaar
 National Campaign for Unorganised Workers
 National Fishworkers’ Forum (NFF)
 National Hawkers Federation
 National Urban Struggle and Action Committee
 Rashtra Seva Dal
 Yuva Bharat

Fraternal Organisations at National Level 
 All India Forum for Right to Education
 Azadi Bachao Andolan
 Bharat Jan Andolan
 Bhartiya Kisan Union
 Campaign for Survival and Dignity
 Ekta Parishad
 Hind Mazdoor Sabha
 India Against Corruption
 Jan Sansad
 Jan Swasthya Abhiyan
 Karnataka Rajya Raitha Sangha
 Lok Rajniti Manch
 Mines, Minerals and People
 National Campaign Committee for Rural Workers
 National Campaign for Right to Information
 National Forum of Forest People and Forest Workers
 National Trade Union Initiative
 National Unorganised Sector Workers Federation
 Pakistan – India People's Forum for Peace and Democracy
 Pension Parishad
 People's Union for Civil Liberties (PUCL)
 Rashtra Seva Dal
 Right to Food Campaign
 Samajwadi Jan Parishad
 Sangharsh
 Sarv Seva Sangh
 Save Sharmila Solidarity Campaign 
 United India Consumer's Association

References

External links 

Political organisations based in India
Progressive International